From January 24 to June 20, 1972, voters of the Democratic Party chose its nominee for president in the 1972 United States presidential election. Senator George McGovern of South Dakota was selected as the nominee through a series of primary elections, caucuses, and state party conventions, culminating in the 1972 Democratic National Convention held from July 10 to July 13, 1972, in Miami, Florida.

Background

1968 election

The 1968 election was one of the most eventual and influential in the history of the Democratic Party. The primaries were contested by President Lyndon B. Johnson, Senator Eugene McCarthy, and Senator Robert F. Kennedy. In a shock, McCarthy forced the incumbent President out of the race early by his strong showing in the New Hampshire primary. Kennedy joined the race soon thereafter, and the two ran on their opposition to Johnson's handling of the Vietnam War. They traded primary victories until Kennedy was assassinated in June.

Although Kennedy and McCarthy contested the popular elections, most of the delegates in 1968 were not popularly elected. Thus, with Kennedy dead and McCarthy lacking support from the party establishment, Johnson's vice president Hubert H. Humphrey was easily nominated on the first ballot at the 1968 Democratic National Convention. Humphrey's nomination, the continuing Vietnam War, and the generally closed nature of the nomination process drew massive protests to Chicago; the convention was generally seen as a major embarrassment for the Party, and Humphrey went on to lose the election narrowly to Richard Nixon.

McGovern-Fraser Commission

In response to the 1968 debacle, party leadership established a twenty-eight member committee selected by Senator Fred R. Harris to reform the presidential nomination process for 1972. The committee was led by Senator George McGovern and Representative Donald M. Fraser. After less than nine months, the committee delivered its guidelines. 

The committee focused on two main principles: uniformity and equity. Guidelines required states adopt uniform, explicit delegate selection rules and weight the delegate allocation in favor of politically marginalized groups (women, blacks and those under the age of 30), including the use of quotas.

In general, the state parties complied with the McGovern-Fraser guidelines by adopting the use of primary elections, rather than delegate selection caucuses or conventions. Thus, the 1972 Democratic nomination is typically considered the first modern presidential primary campaign. Harris and McGovern, having played a direct role in the reforms and having a detailed knowledge of their impact, were seen to gain an advantage as potential candidates for the nomination.

Nixon administration and 1970 midterm elections

As 1972 approached, President Richard Nixon faced uncertain re-election prospects. Nixon had been elected on a platform to end American involvement in Vietnam, but his strategy of gradual "Vietnamization" had proceeded more slowly than planned. The Paris Peace Talks had bogged down, dimming hopes for a negotiated settlement to the war. In fact, Nixon had widened the conflict by invading Cambodia in 1970, a move that ignited criticism in the press and Congress and widespread disorder on college campuses, including the Kent State shootings in May 1970.

On the domestic front, a sharp recession had shaken investor confidence, and Nixon's plan to control inflation with wage and price controls had failed to meet its objective. The administration's attempt to steer a middle course on desegregation busing and affirmative action had displeased liberals and conservatives alike. 

In the 1970 elections, Democrats gained a dozen seats in the House, although their Senate majority was slightly reduced by three seats. Their main success was not in Congress, however, but the states. Eleven different Democratic governors were elected to seats held by Republicans and not a single incumbent Democrat lost re-election.

Pre-primary maneuvering
Given Nixon's apparent weakness and the novel use of the primary system, a large field of credible Democratic challengers emerged.

Early speculation surrounded Senator Ted Kennedy, the brother of the late President and Senator who had contested the 1968 nomination. He ruled himself out early in 1971, but nevertheless continued to lead in opinion polling. In the event of a brokered convention, some believed Kennedy could emerge as the consensus nominee. Kennedy supporters took key positions on a number of presidential campaigns, strengthening his odds of gaining the candidates' support in the event they could not secure the required delegates.

With Kennedy out, the establishment favorite for the Democratic nomination was Ed Muskie, a moderate Senator who had acquitted himself well as Humphrey's running mate in 1968. In August 1971 polling amid a growing economic crisis, Muskie led Nixon.

U.S. Representative Shirley Chisholm from Queens announced her candidacy in January 1972, making her the first black candidate to contest a major party's nomination for President. Chisholm was also the first woman to run for the Democratic presidential nomination; she was later joined by Patsy Mink of Hawaii.

Primary campaign

New Hampshire
Prior to the New Hampshire primary, the "Canuck Letter" was published in the Manchester Union-Leader. The letter (later revealed to have been forged as part of the "dirty tricks" campaign by Nixon staffers) claimed that Muskie had made disparaging remarks about French-Canadians. The paper subsequently published an attack on Muskie's wife Jane, reporting that she drank and used off-color language. Muskie made an emotional defense of his wife in a speech outside the newspaper's offices during a snowstorm. Though Muskie later stated that what had appeared to the press as tears were actually melted snowflakes, the press reported that Muskie broke down and cried. Muskie did worse than expected in the primary, while McGovern came in a surprisingly close second. McGovern now had the momentum, which was well orchestrated by his campaign manager, Gary Hart.

Hubert Humphrey made another run at the nomination, in an era when previous nominees were considered legitimate contenders even after losing a general election (Adlai Stevenson had been successful at being re-nominated by Democrats in 1956, and Nixon by the GOP in 1968).  He fell just short in delegates, despite winning the popular vote in the 24 states and the District of Columbia which held preference primary and caucus elections open to the rank and file Democratic voter.  His bid to contest the results of the California winner-take-all primary failed. Humphrey, like Senator Henry "Scoop" Jackson, was considered the favorite of the party establishment after Muskie's withdrawal.

Alabama governor George Wallace, with his "outsider" image, did well in the South (he won every county in the Florida primary with the exception of Miami-Dade) and among alienated and dissatisfied voters. What might have become a forceful campaign was cut short when Wallace was shot while campaigning, and left paralyzed in an assassination attempt by Arthur Bremer.  Within hours of the assassination attempt, then-President Richard M. Nixon and a top aide dispatched a political operative, E. Howard Hunt, who rushed to Milwaukee, with plans to surreptitiously enter Bremer's apartment, and plant the campaign literature of Democratic contender George McGovern's campaign as a means to drive Wallace supporters away from the Democratic Party and toward Nixon and Republican candidates.  Hunt aborted his clandestine operation after the FBI had already sealed off Bremer's apartment prior to his arrival.

Chairman of the House Ways and Means Committee Wilbur Mills was drafted by friends and fellow Congressmen to make himself available as a candidate for the primaries.  To position himself to appeal to senior citizens during the 1972 presidential campaign, Mills championed the automatic Cost Of Living Adjustment (COLA) to Social Security. He was not strong in the primaries and won 33 votes for president from the delegates at the 1972 Democratic National Convention which nominated Senator George McGovern.

Washington Senator Scoop Jackson was little known nationally when he first ran for President in 1972. McGovern accused Jackson of racism for his opposition to busing. Jackson's high point in the campaign was a distant third in the early Florida primary, but he failed to stand out of the pack of better-known rivals, and only made real news later in the campaign as part of the "Anybody but McGovern" coalition, that raised what would be known as the "Acid, Amnesty and Abortion" questions about McGovern.  Jackson suspended active campaigning in May after a weak showing in the Ohio primary. Jackson did re-emerge at the August Democratic convention after runner-up Humphrey dropped out of the race. Jackson's name was placed in nomination by Georgia Governor Jimmy Carter, and he finished second in the delegate roll call, well behind nominee McGovern.

Attempted Wallace assassination, Maryland, and Michigan: May 15–16

While campaigning in Laurel, Maryland, on May 15, 1972, Wallace was shot five times by Arthur Bremer. Three others wounded in the shooting also survived. Bremer's diary, published after his arrest as a book titled An Assassin's Diary, showed that Bremer's assassination attempt was not motivated by politics, but by a desire for fame, and that President Nixon had been a possible target. The assassination attempt left Wallace paralyzed for the rest of his life, as one of the bullets had lodged in his spinal column.

As a result of the shooting, President Nixon dispatched Secret Service protection to Representatives Shirley Chisholm and Wilbur Mills (two candidates who had not been assigned Secret Service details up to then) as well as Senator Ted Kennedy (though not running, because of his brothers John and Robert having been assassinated).

Following the shooting, Wallace won the May 16 primaries in Maryland and Michigan. Wallace spoke at the Democratic National Convention from his wheelchair in Miami on July 11, 1972. Bremer was sentenced to 53 years in prison for the shooting. He served 35 years of the sentence and was released on parole on November 9, 2007.

Endorsements
Gloria Steinem and Betty Friedan ran as Chisholm delegates in New York. By the 1972 election, the women's movement was rapidly expanding its political power.  Steinem, along with Congresswomen Chisholm and Bella Abzug, had founded the National Women's Political Caucus in July 1971.

Nevertheless, Steinem was reluctant to re-join the McGovern campaign. Though she had brought in McGovern's single largest campaign contributor in 1968, she "still had been treated like a frivolous pariah by much of McGovern's campaign staff."  And in April 1972, Steinem remarked that he "still doesn't understand the women's movement."

Earlier in the primary campaign, Muskie had gained the support of Ohio Governor John Gilligan; Pennsylvania Governor Milton Shapp; Iowa Senator Harold Hughes and United Auto Workers president Leonard Woodcock.

Candidates

Unannounced Candidates

Favorite sons

Polling

National polling

Caucuses 
11 states held caucuses before the 1972 convention in which one candidate captured a majority of support:
June 18: Montana - George McGovern
June 19: Arkansas - Wilbur Mills

Primaries

Statewide contests by winner

Results by county

Total primaries popular vote

Analysis 
In the end, McGovern succeeded in winning the nomination by winning primaries through grass-roots support in spite of establishment opposition. He had led a commission to redesign the Democratic nomination system after the messy and confused nomination struggle and convention of 1968.  The fundamental principle of the McGovern-Fraser Commission—that the Democratic primaries should determine the winner of the Democratic nomination—lasted throughout every subsequent nomination contest.  However, the new rules angered many prominent Democrats whose influence was marginalized, and those politicians refused to support McGovern's campaign (some even supporting Nixon instead), leaving the McGovern campaign at a significant disadvantage in funding compared to Nixon.

See also
Republican Party presidential primaries, 1972

Notes

References

Further reading